Altrincham and Sale West is a constituency in Greater Manchester. Since its creation in 1997 it has been represented by Sir Graham Brady, a member of the Conservative Party.

History
The 1995 Boundary Commission review led to its creation for the 1997 election largely from the old seat of Altrincham and Sale, and has been held since then by the Conservative Graham Brady, appointed by his colleagues the chairman of the backbench 1922 Committee (2010 to present).

Boundaries

1997–2010: The Borough of Trafford wards of Altrincham, Bowdon, Broadheath, Hale, Mersey St Mary's, St Martin's, Timperley, and Village.

2010–present: The Borough of Trafford wards of Altrincham, Ashton on Mersey, Bowdon, Broadheath, Hale Barns, Hale Central, St Mary's, Timperley, and Village.

The constituency is one of three covering the Metropolitan Borough of Trafford.  It covers the south of the borough, covering the town of Altrincham and the west of Sale. It is bordered by the constituencies of Stretford and Urmston, Tatton, Warrington North, Warrington South, and Wythenshawe and Sale East.

Constituency profile
The economy of the area is diverse and closely linked to the success of private business in the North West. From 2001 to 2010, it was the only Conservative seat in Greater Manchester, and predecessor seats have always been Conservative. In 1997, local grammar school-educated Graham Brady was elected on a small majority of 1,500. His majority peaked at over 13,000 in 2015, was reduced in 2017 to just under 7,000, and fell further to 6,139 in 2019. Trafford was one of three areas in Greater Manchester to vote Remain in the EU referendum. However, Brady campaigned to Leave.

A highly affluent area, workless claimants who were registered jobseekers, in November 2012, were a lower proportion of Altrincham and Sale West's population than the national average of 3.8%, and the slightly higher regional average of 4.2%, at 2.3% of the population based on a statistical compilation by The Guardian.

In the 2022 local council elections, Labour gained the ward of Ashton-on-Mersey, as well as retaining Broadheath, with the Liberal Democrats gaining ground in Timperley and Village, and the Green Party now having all three councillors in Altrincham and a further gain in Hale Central. The constituency includes some of the most expensive residential streets in the North-West England, typified by areas like Bowdon and Hale Barns, which are safely Conservative. Several Black British premiership footballers and millionaire British Asian businessmen and women also live in the constituency.

Members of Parliament

Elections

Elections in the 2010s

Elections in the 2000s

Elections in the 1990s

See also
 List of parliamentary constituencies in Greater Manchester

Notes

References

Parliamentary constituencies in Greater Manchester
Constituencies of the Parliament of the United Kingdom established in 1997
Politics of Trafford